Euthynotus is an extinct genus of prehistoric bony fish that lived during the early Toarcian stage of the Early Jurassic epoch. It is generally considered the basalmost pachycormiform.

Species
Euthynotus has two species classified within it:
 Euthynotus incognitus Blainville, 1818
 Euthynotus intermedius Agassiz, 1839

See also

 Prehistoric fish
 List of prehistoric bony fish

References

Early Jurassic fish
Pachycormiformes
Jurassic fish of Europe